Wu Kung-i or Wu Gongyi (1898–1970) was a well-known teacher of the soft style martial art t'ai chi ch'uan (taijiquan) in China, and, after 1949, in the British colony of Hong Kong. He was also the "gate-keeper" of the Wu family from 1942 until his death in 1970.

Biography
Wu Kung-i was the grandson of the founder of Wu-style t'ai chi ch'uan, Wu Ch'uan-yu. Wu Ch'uan-yu's son, Wu Chien-ch'uan, became the best known teacher in his family, and is therefore also considered the co-founder of the Wu-style.  Wu Kung-i was his eldest son. Wu Kung-i's younger brother and sister, Wu Kung-tsao and Wu Ying-hua, were also well-known teachers. The Wu family were originally of Manchu ancestry.

There was a tradition in the Chinese martial arts that youngsters be taught by teachers of a generation older than their parents'. Since Wu Ch'uan-yu had died while Wu Kung-i was an infant, he and his brother were taught as young men by Yang Shao-hou, who was technically a generation senior to their father. Both Yang Shao-hou and Wu Chien-ch'uan were famous for their "small circle" martial expertise. The motions of t'ai chi ch'uan forms and pushing hands are all based on different sized circles, small circle movements in the forms and applications follow a more compact pathway for different leverage applications than larger circles.

After the fall of the Ch'ing dynasty in 1912, a new teaching environment was created. More people became aware of t'ai chi ch'uan, and the former dynamic of small classes and intensive military instruction of relatively young students became less practical. Wu Kung-i responded to the new demands of larger class sizes and older beginning level students by changing some aspects of the beginning level hand forms he taught. His modifications of the "square" forms he had learned from his father and the slightly different form he learned from Yang Shao-hou, distinguished by clear sectional instructions for each move in the form sequence, more compact "small circle" movements in the body and somewhat higher stances with the feet relatively closer together than in other styles of t'ai chi ch'uan. Wu Kung-i also formulated new styles of pushing hands based on smaller circles, most notably the "four corner" method of basic pushing hands.

Wu Kung-i's children were also full-time t'ai chi ch'uan teachers; his oldest son Wu Ta-k'uei, his second son, Wu Ta-ch'i and his daughter, Wu Yen-hsia.

In 1953, the fifty-three-year-old Wu was publicly challenged to a fight by the thirty-something Tibetan White Crane stylist Ch'en K'e-fu (陈克夫). The contest was arranged and fought in Macau in January, 1954. The ring was set up as if for a Western boxing match, and there were many rules prohibiting various techniques being used by the fighters; kicks, throws or joint locks, for example. The contest lasted not quite two rounds.  During the second round, the judges ended the fight, declaring the contest a draw.  This was done to ensure that there was no loss of face to either party.  Both Wu and Ch'en invited the opposing sides to celebratory banquets.  The contest was reported in detail by the media of the day, and resulted in many new students for the Wu family school, including a martial art teaching contract for Wu Ta-k'uei from the Kowloon police.

T'ai chi ch'uan lineage tree with Wu-style focus

References

External links
 International Wu Style Tai Chi Chuan Federation website
 Detroit, Michigan Wu style website
 

1898 births
1970 deaths
Chinese tai chi practitioners
Manchu martial artists